The Liberty University School of Law is the law school of Liberty University, a private Evangelical Christian university in Lynchburg, Virginia. The school offers the J.D., L.L.M., and J.M. degrees.

History
The Liberty University School of Law was founded in 2004 as a division of Liberty University, an Evangelical school. Liberty University School of Law received provisional accreditation in 2006 and became fully accredited by the American Bar Association in 2010.

The original dean was Bruce W. Green, who was responsible for guiding the school in obtaining Liberty's provisional accreditation by the American Bar Association in February 2006. Green resigned in May 2006 at which time Mathew D. Staver assumed the position. In 2015, B. Keith Faulkner assumed the deanship at Liberty University School of Law. Faulkner had previously served as the dean of the Campbell University Lundy-Fetterman School of Business.

Buildings and campus
The School of Law's Supreme Courtroom contains an exact replica of the Supreme Court of the United States judges' bench.

Tuition and financial aid
Tuition for the 2016-2017 academic year is $29,994, with estimated costs and fees totaling an additional $19,108. The Law School Transparency estimated the debt-financed cost of attendance for three years, based on data from the 2015-2016 academic year, is $182,400. In 2016 the U.S. News & World Report ranked Liberty as one of the private law schools that award the most financial aid, providing a median grant of $19,500.

Statistics and rankings

Student and faculty
The student to faculty ratio is 10.2 to 1.  As of the Class of 2019, there were 64 full-time students and no part-time students in the 1L class.  For incoming students, the median LSAT score was 152 and the median undergraduate GPA was 3.43. Minorities made up 20% of the class and women 42%. The number of states represented were 40 and 11 foreign countries were represented in the Class of 2019.

Bar Exam passage rates
In July 2015 and July 2016, the School of Law had first-time passage rates on the Virginia Bar Exam of 93% and 89% respectively. These rates placed them first in 2015 and second in 2016 among the eight law schools in Virginia. The school has also seen recent bar exam success in other states, such as North Carolina. Liberty had one of the top five bar passage rates in the entire nation for 2018.

School rankings
The School of Law's ranking given by the U.S. News & World Report is 147-192 (bottom 25%). Above the Law reported that U.S. News & World Report named Liberty University's law school as one of the top five most popular schools in the nation, defined as the schools with the highest applicant yield, along with Yale Law School, BYU's J. Reuben Clark Law School, and Harvard Law School. Above the Law theorized that this is because students who get into Liberty do not have many other options. In 2015, National Jurist ranked the school as one of the best schools for public service careers in the area of defender/prosecutor training beside schools such as Washington College of Law, Florida State University College of Law, and UC Davis School of Law.

Employment
According to Liberty University's ABA-required disclosures, 77.8% of the Class of 2018 obtained full-time, bar passage required employment nine months after graduation. Liberty's Law School Transparency under-employment score was 27.6%, indicating the percentage of the Class of 2014 unemployed, pursuing an additional degree, or working in a non-professional, short-term, or part-time job nine months after graduation. In 2011, U.S. News & World Report  recognized the School of Law as being in the top 17 percent of all law schools for placing graduates as law clerks for federal courts. As of 2023, the median starting private sector salary for graduates was $57,500 and the median public service starting salary was $56,900.

Partnerships
The School of Law has two partnerships with the Liberty Counsel: 
The Liberty Center for Law and Policy is a joint partnership between the School of Law and the Liberty Counsel. It provides information, research, and expertise to affect legislation and public policy at the local, state, and national level.
The Center for Constitutional Litigation Clinic.

The School of Law also partners with the Bedford Commonwealth Attorney's Office for The Prosecution Clinic in order to expose students to prosecution experience.

Notable people

Alumni 
Matt Krause (first Class of 2007), Republican member of the Texas House of Representatives from District 93 and a lawyer in Fort Worth, Texas

Faculty 
 Phill Kline (2009-Current), former district attorney of Johnson County, Kansas,  Attorney General of Kansas, and member of the Kansas House of Representatives whose license to practice law was suspended indefinitely.

References

External links
 

Law schools in Virginia
School of Law
Educational institutions established in 2004
2004 establishments in Virginia
Conservatism in the United States